Women's Eastern Sprints refers to the annual rowing championship for the Eastern Association of Women's Rowing Colleges (EAWRC) league.  The teams include all of the Ivy League schools as well as others such as MIT, BU, and Wisconsin.

The race is held on the Cooper River in Camden, New Jersey.

EAWRC Varsity Openweight 8 Winners

EAWRC Varsity Lightweight 8 Winners
 2015 - Radcliffe 
 2014-  Radcliffe
 2013 - Radcliffe 
 2012 - Wisconsin
 2011 - Princeton
 2010 - Wisconsin
 2009 - Wisconsin
 2008 - Wisconsin
 2007- Wisconsin
 2006- Wisconsin
 2005- Wisconsin
 2004- Radcliffe
 2003- Princeton
 2002- Princeton
 2001- Wisconsin
 2000- Princeton
 1999- Princeton
 1998- Princeton
 1997- Radcliffe
 1996- Radcliffe
 1994- Radcliffe
 1993- Radcliffe
 1990- Radcliffe
 1989- Rochester
 1987- Radcliffe
 1985- Radcliffe
 1984- Radcliffe
 1983- Smith
 1981- MIT
 1980- Radcliffe
 1979- Boston University
 1977- Radcliffe
 1976- Boston University

References

External links
Pictures from Eastern Sprints by year

College rowing competitions in the United States
Women's rowing in the United States
Row
Row
Rowing
Sports competitions in New Jersey
College sports in New Jersey
Sports in Camden, New Jersey
Eastern Association of Women's Rowing Colleges
Women's sports in New Jersey